Julie Schumacher is an American novelist, essayist, short story writer and academic. She is a Regents Professor of Creative Writing and English at the University of Minnesota. Schumacher specializes in creative writing, contemporary fiction, and children's literature.

Education
Schumacher received her bachelor's degree in Spanish and Creative Writing from Oberlin College in 1981. She earned her Master of Fine Arts degree in Fiction from Cornell University in 1986.

Career
Following her MFA, Schumacher held brief appointments as an instructor at Saint Olaf College and other academic institutions before joining the faculty at the University of Minnesota as an associate professor in 1996. She was promoted to Professor in 2008, and became Regents Professor in 2021. She has won multiple teaching awards and served as Director of the MFA Creative Writing Program at the University of Minnesota for twelve years.

Schumacher is married to Lawrence R. Jacobs, the Walter F. and Joan Mondale Chair for Political Studies and the Director of the Center for the Study of Politics at the University of Minnesota.

Works
Schumacher has authored multiple novels, stories, and essays.  Her first novel, The Body Is Water, was an ALA Notable Book of the Year and a finalist for the PEN/Hemingway Award. Her other books include An Explanation for Chaos and five books for young readers:  The Unbearable Book Club for Unsinkable Girls, The Chain Letter, Black Box, The Book of One Hundred Truths, and Grass Angel.
Schumacher is also the author of the national best-seller, Dear Committee Members, for which she was awarded the Thurber Prize for American Humor. She was the first woman to win the Thurber Prize.

In 2014, Kirkus Reviews called Dear Committee Members a “funny epistolary novel composed of recommendation letters written by a caustic, frustrated and cautiously hopeful English professor named Jason Fitger." An NPR review noted that the novel "deftly mixes comedy with social criticism and righteous outrage. By the end, you may well find yourself laughing so hard it hurts."

In 2018, Schumacher published The Shakespeare Requirement, a literary "satire that oscillates between genuine compassion and scathing mockery with admirable dexterity" (Kirkus). The New Yorker described the novel as a "sad-professor satire that burns with moral anger."

Awards and honors
1995 - PEN/Hemingway finalist and ALA Notable book of the Year, The Body Is Water2000 - Loft Award in Creative Prose, The Loft Literary Center
2007 - Minnesota Book Award 
2008 - Distinguished Educator Award, The College of Continuing Education 
2010 - Horace T. Morse-Minnesota Alumni Association Award for Outstanding Contributions to Undergraduate Education
2011 – Rockefeller Foundation Bellagio Fellowship
2015 - Winner, Thurber Prize for American Humor 
2016 - 2019 - Scholar of the College, University of Minnesota
2019 - Award for Outstanding Contributions to Graduate and Professional Education, University of Minnesota 
2021 - Regents Professorship, University of Minnesota

Bibliography
BooksThe Body is Water (1995) ISBN 9781569470428An Explanation for Chaos (1998) ISBN 9780380730506Grass Angel (2004) ISBN 9780385730730The Chain Letter (2005) ISBN 9780385731690The Book of One Hundred Truths (2006) ISBN 9780385732901Black Box (2008) ISBN 9780385735421The Unbearable Book Club for Unsinkable Girls (2012) ISBN 9780385737739Dear Committee Members (2014) ISBN 9780345807335Doodling for Academics: A Coloring and Activity Book (2017) ISBN 9780226467047The Shakespeare Requirement'' (2018) ISBN 978-0385542340

Selected essays/articles
“Was This Student Dangerous?” The New York Times, June 18, 2014
“What My Mother Wanted Us to Pack,” The New York Times, Sunday, November 8, 2015
“I Married a Pundit.” Minnesota Alumni Magazine, Fall 2018.

Personal life
Schumacher is married to Lawrence R. Jacobs, a political scientist and founder and director of the Center for the Study of Politics and Governance (CSPG) at the University of Minnesota. He was appointed the Walter F. and Joan Mondale Chair for Political Studies at the University of Minnesota’s Humphrey School of Public Affairs in 2005 and holds the McKnight Presidential Chair. They met in an English class during their first year at Oberlin College.

They have two adult daughters, Emma Lillian Jacobs and Isabella Nan Jacobs Hale.

References 

Living people
American women novelists
Oberlin College alumni
Cornell University alumni
University of Minnesota faculty
Writers from Wilmington, Delaware
Year of birth missing (living people)
21st-century American women